German Village was the nickname for a range of mock houses constructed in 1943 by the U.S. Army in the Dugway Proving Ground in Utah, roughly  southwest of Salt Lake City, in order to conduct experiments used for the bombing of Nazi Germany.

History

Dugway was a high-security testing facility for chemical and biological weapons. The purpose of the replicas of German homes, which were repeatedly rebuilt after being intentionally burned down, was to perfect tactics in the fire bombing of German residential areas during World War II.

The U.S. Army employed German émigré architects such as Erich Mendelsohn to create copies as accurate as possible of the dwellings of densely populated poorer quarters of Berlin. The main goal was to find a tactic to achieve a fire storm in the city center.

The architects who worked on the German village and on the Japanese equivalent also included Konrad Wachsmann and Antonin Raymond.

The U.S. Army also hired Standard Oil Development Company to assist in the practical testing and construction.
Erich Mendelsohn and Konrad Wachsmann advised on construction techniques and materials.
Paul Zucker, Hans Knoll and George Hartmueller advised on designing authentic interior furnishings.

The village was authentic down to the smallest details, including authentic German heavy furnishings, clothes hanging in closets and children's toys.

Wood and paint, both for interior and exterior, was selected so it would be authentic both in the German and Japanese village; in the Japanese village there were chopsticks on the tables. The German village cost $575,000 to build.

It was found that it was easier to set fire to Japanese housing, but that German houses were more likely to have uncontrollable fires.

See also
 Japanese Village (Dugway Proving Ground)
 Strategic bombing during World War II

References

Further reading

External links

 Aerial view of German and Japanese villages, May 27 1943
 Assault on German Village (Translation of article below)
 Angriff auf "German Village" Der Spiegel 11.10.1999
 "German Village" may soon crumble
 Historic Evaluation of German Village at U.S. Army Dugway Proving Grounds
 US Army Bases
 Dugway MIL site on the village (With images of the village)
 Goodbye to Berlin
 Background and drawings from the US government
 themilitarystandard

World War II strategic bombing of Germany
Firebombings
Aerial bombing
Aerial warfare strategy
Incendiary weapons
Military installations established in 1943
Buildings and structures in Tooele County, Utah
Weapons test sites
1943 establishments in Utah